The Song of Life (Italian: Il canto della vita) is a 1945 Italian melodrama film directed by Carmine Gallone and starring Alida Valli, Carlo Ninchi and María Mercader. It is set during the German occupation of Rome in the Second World War before the Liberation of the city in 1944.

It was shot at the Scalera Studios in Rome. The film's sets were designed by the art director Gastone Medin.

Cast
 Alida Valli as Giovanna  
 Carlo Ninchi as Padron Cesare  
 María Mercader as Maria  
 Roberto Bruni as Giacomo, figlio di Cesare  
 Luigi Almirante as Il vecchio Po  
 Mario Pisu as Rimondino  
 Roberto Donati as Il piccolo Cesare  
 Dina Romano as La vecchia zia di

References

Bibliography 
 Sara Pesce. Memoria e immaginario: la Seconda Guerra mondiale nel cinema italiano. Le mani, 2008.

External links 
 

1945 films
Italian drama films
Italian black-and-white films
1945 drama films
Films directed by Carmine Gallone
Films set in Rome
Minerva Film films
Melodrama films
1940s Italian films